Kirkland is a surname. It originated from a habitational name with variant spellings Kirtland and Kirtlan, from the English word Kirk meaning church, plus land, and was originally given either as a topographical name to someone resident on land belonging to the church, or as a locational name from any of the several places named Kirkland.

A
Alexander Kirkland
Anthony Kirkland, American serial killer

B
Boyd Kirkland
Brian Joseph Kirkland (born 1981), American politician

C
Caroline Kirkland
Charles Kirkland
Chris Kirkland, English footballer

D
Dennis Kirkland, British producer and director
Douglas Kirkland (1934-2022), Canadian-born American photographer

E
Eddie Kirkland (1923–2011), American blues musician
Edward C. Kirkland (c. 1894 – 1975), American historian
Edward R. Kirkland (1923–2012), American politician

G
Gelsey Kirkland, American ballet dancer
Gordon Kirkland (coach) (1904–1953), football, baseball and basketball coach
Graeme Kirkland

J
James I. Kirkland (born 1954), American geologist and palaeontologist
James Hampton Kirkland
Jari Kirkland, American ski mountaineer and marathon mountain biker
Jaxson Kirkland (born 1998), American football player
Jerusha Bingham Kirkland (1743-1788), American missionary
Jessica Kirkland, American tennis player
Jim Kirkland (born 1946), English footballer
John Thornton Kirkland (1770–1840), president of Harvard University (1810–1828)
Joseph Kirkland (1830–1894), novelist
Diamond D, born Joseph Kirkland, music producer

K
Kenny Kirkland

L
Lane Kirkland (1922–1999), president of the AFL-CIO
Leigh G. Kirkland (1873–1942), American politician
Leroy Kirkland (1904–1988), American musician
Levon Kirkland

M
Marie-Claire Kirkland
Mark Kirkland
Muriel Kirkland

N
Niatia Jessica Kirkland, singer

P
Pee Wee Kirkland

R
Richard Kirkland, noted for his bravery during the Battle of Fredericksburg in the American Civil War
Ricky Kirkland, (born December 5, 1965)in Dothan, Alabama. Created a large Christmas themed Light Show in Dothan called "Christmas on Oakwood" that has been operating annually for over twelve years.

S
Sally Kirkland, American actor
Sally Kirkland (editor)
Samuel Kirkland (1741–1808), Presbyterian missionary to the Oneida and Tuscarora Iroquois
Sean D. Kirkland, American philosopher

T
Thaddeus Kirkland (born 1955), American politician
Thomas Kirkland (1721–1798), English physician and medical writer

V
Vance Kirkland

W
Wilbur Kirkland (born 1947), American basketball player
Willie Kirkland

English-language surnames
Surnames of English origin